Manuel Komnenos (1118–1180) was a Byzantine emperor.

Manuel Komnenos may also refer to:
 Manuel Erotikos Komnenos (955/960 – c. 1020), progenitor of the Komnenian dynasty
 Manuel Komnenos (kouropalates) (c. 1045 – 1071), older brother of Alexios I Komnenos
 Manuel Komnenos (son of Andronikos I) (1145–1185), eldest son of Andronikos I Komnenos and father of Alexios I of Trebizond

See also
 Manuel I of Trebizond or Manuel I Megas Komnenos (died 1263), Emperor of Trebizond
 Manuel II of Trebizond or Manuel II Megas Komnenos (c. 1324–1333), Emperor of Trebizond
 Manuel III of Trebizond or Manuel IIII Megas Komnenos (1364–1417), Emperor of Trebizond